In Toxoplasma gondii  the translational repression of  lactate dehydrogenase 1 (LDH1)  was discovered to be mediated through its  5′UTR. A small nucleotide regulatory RNA hairpin was shown to be essential for the repression. It is possible that this hairpin may act as the nucleation site for the binding of a trans-acting factor(s) that allow for the translational repression.

References 

RNA
Non-coding RNA
Cis-regulatory RNA elements